Anoushka Sabnis (born January 27, 2007) is an Indian writer, poet, public speaker and entrepreneur. She holds a world record for poetry and has multiple publications till date. She published her first book at the age of 10 and has since been active in advocating the benefits of reading and writing especially for children.

Education
Sabnis is a high school student studying in New Delhi, India.

Writing career 
Anoushka started composing stories and posting them on her blog in 2012, at the age of five. In 2013, she composed her first poem.

As a new year resolution in 2016, she took up a challenge of writing poems and ended the year with 52 poems written over the 52 weekends of the year. Her first book, Once Upon a Verse – become poems tell stories, is a collection of these poems, published by Partridge Publishing in December 2017.

She has since been writing and publishing short stories and poems.

Awards & honours 
Anoushka created a world record by becoming the "Youngest Poet to Publish a Poetry Book Internationally (female)" at the age of 10, recognised by World Records India in September 2019.

She is a 2-time recipient of the Gold Award at the Queen's Commonwealth Essay Competition, organised annually by the Royal Commonwealth Society, London, in 2018 and 2020.

Anoushka received the Young Leader Award for entrepreneurship and innovation and spoke on Teen Entrepreneurship at the 84th Annual Women Economic Forum 2022, in New Delhi.

Public speaking 
Anoushka is a regular speaker at national and international literary festivals where she talks about children's literature, inculcating reading habits in children and young adults and shares anecdotes from her own life and writing journey.

She was a speaker at the Jaipur Literature Festival 2019 and Jaipur Book Mark 2019. She spoke at the AIM Literary Festival in 2020. In 2021, Anoushka spoke about the importance of reading amongst children and young adults, at the third edition of the Orange City Literature Festival. In 2022, she spoke at the inaugural Orange City Literature Festival – Children's Edition on how young children can become writers. She spoke at the 84th Annual Women Economic Forum 2022 on Teen Entrepreneurship.

Entrepreneurship 
Anoushka is passionate about helping children and young adults develop active reading habits and writing skills.

Her startup, Biblioverse – the universe of books, is on a mission to build India's first and largest community of young readers and writers, a platform to encourage networking, peer learning and making people fall in love with books and stories.

Books 
'A Bottle of Achaar' in 'The Great Indian Teen Fiction Collective', Publisher: Notion Press, December 2022

'The Boy who saved the World' in Golden Light – Sterling Short Stories, Publisher: Scholastic India, June 2021

Elijah – the Chosen One, Publisher: Amazon Kindle Direct Publishing, October 2020

'The Earth I want to See When I Grow Up' in an anthology of essays, Pen the Change, Publisher: Authors Press, November 2018

Once Upon a Verse – because poems tell stories, collection of 52 self-composed poems, Publisher: Partridge Publishing, December 2017

Organisations 
Member of The Commonwealth Students' Welfare Group of India (CSWGI), an affiliate of The Royal Commonwealth Society, London, September 2020

Recognised as a Global Goodwill Ambassador from Asia by the GGA Foundation April 2018.

See also
List of Indian writers

References

External links
 Anoushka Sabnis, Jaipur Book Mark
 Once Upon a Verse : Because Poems Tell Stories
 DNA India – Young Poet's Club – Anoushka Sabnis
 DNA India 
 The Quint – Anoushka Sabnis – World Poetry Day
 Indspire Me – Anoushka Sabnis
 Anoushka Sabnis blog
 Live Wire, Anoushka Sabnis, My COVID Cocoon

Living people
2007 births
Indian women poets
Child writers